Abemus is a genus of beetles belonging to the family Staphylinidae.

The species of this genus are found in Europe and Africa.

Species:

Abemus africanus 
Abemus chloropterus 
Abemus chloropterus 
Abemus hebraeus 
Abemus hemichrysis 
Abemus hottentottus 
Abemus olivaceus 
Abemus vethi

References

Staphylinidae
Beetle genera